Astralarctia canalis is a moth of the family Erebidae first described by William Schaus in 1921. It is found in Panama.

References

Phaegopterina
Moths described in 1921
Moths of Central America